i786 may refer to:
NetBurst (microarchitecture), post 6th-generation Intel microarchitecture (P68)
Athlon, 7th-generation AMD microarchitecture
The SSE2 instruction set, as found in NetBurst and Athlon 64 and later processors